The Southern Expressway is Sri Lanka's first E Class highway. The  highway links the Sri Lankan capital Colombo with Galle, Matara and Hambantota, major cities in the south of the island.

The Southern Expressway Project (SEP) was introduced by the Road Development Authority and the Ministry of Highways as far back as late 1980s. The University of Moratuwa undertook an Environment Impact Assessment study in 1996, which was submitted to the government in early 1997.

Construction of the highway began in 2003 and completion up to Galle was achieved by November 2011. March 2014 saw the section from Galle to Matara being declared open to the public. The construction of the expressway was partly funded by the Japan Bank for International Cooperation, who were responsible for the  section between Kurundugahahetekma and Kokmaduwa, and the Asian Development Bank, responsible for the  section between Kurundugahahetekma and Pinnaduwa. The expressway reduces the time taken to travel from Colombo to Galle to one hour from three hours, and Colombo to Matara to one and a half hours from four hours taken by the regular A2 highway.

The extension of the expressway to Hambantota was inaugurated on 4 July 2015. The extension will be four lanes (with allowance of further two lanes in future), the cost of US$180M being funded by the Exim Bank of China.

On 10 August 2015, a Highway Traffic Management system was inaugurated and currently covers the length of the expressway, including the Outer-Circular Expressway.

On 23 February 2020, The final stage of the expressway which links to Hambanthota was opened to the public.

Intersections

Earnings and traffic volumes

Toll structure
Toll collection is currently done manually in cash by toll collectors. An electronic toll collection system has been proposed.

See also

References

External links
Expressway Operation Maintenance And Management Division
Road Development Authority

Highways in Sri Lanka